Uma Leht (literally Our Own Newspaper) is the only newspaper in the Võro language which is spoken in Southern Estonia. The newspaper is owned by the Foundation Võro Selts VKKF and issued every fortnight.

External links
Online version of newspaper "Uma Leht"

Newspapers published in Estonia
Võro
Newspapers established in 2000
2000 establishments in Estonia
Mass media in Võru
Estonian-language newspapers
Biweekly newspapers